Antonio Roberto Cabrera (born 17 October 1943) is an Argentine former footballer. He competed in the men's tournament at the 1964 Summer Olympics.

References

External links
 
 

1943 births
Living people
Argentine footballers
Argentina international footballers
Olympic footballers of Argentina
Footballers at the 1964 Summer Olympics
Footballers from Buenos Aires
Association football midfielders
Boca Juniors footballers
Club Atlético Atlanta footballers